N. Sasidharan (born 1952) is an Indian Botanist.

References

Living people
1952 births
20th-century Indian botanists
Place of birth missing (living people)
Date of birth missing (living people)